Arhopala allata suffusa, the Tytler's rosy oakblue, sometimes placed in Amblypodia, is a small subspecies of butterfly found in India that belongs to the lycaenids or blues family.

Range
The butterfly occurs in India from Manipur across onto southern Shan states, Dawnas and Ataran.
The species has also been spotted in Bangladesh.

Status
This subspecies is rare.

See also
Lycaenidae
List of butterflies of India (Lycaenidae)

Cited references

References
  
 
 
 

Arhopala
Butterflies of Asia
Butterfly subspecies